Indru is a 2003 Indian Tamil-language crime film directed by Naveen S. Muthuraman. The film stars Karthik and Tanu Roy. The film has the usual elements and did not make an impact at the box office.

Cast

Karthik as Goutham
Tanu Roy as Jennifer
Karunas as Vishwanath
Devan as Ramprasad
Nizhalgal Ravi as Colonel Somnath
Delhi Ganesh as Richard's father
Pyramid Natarajan as Minister Oppilamani
Thalaivasal Vijay as Superior Officer
Sriman as Richard 
Ajay Rathnam as Superior Officer
Vasu Vikram as S.P. Elumalai
 Kumaresan as Pandian
Radhika Chaudhari as Nandhini
Fathima Babu as Gauthaman's mother
Madhan Bob as Minister's P.A
Aadukalam Naren as Ramprasad's henchman
Raj Kapoor as Captain Kapoor
Ramji as Special appearance

Soundtrack
The soundtrack was composed by Deva, and lyrics were written by Na. Muthukumar, Yugabharathi, and the director himself.

References

2003 films
2000s Tamil-language films
Indian action war films
Films scored by Deva (composer)
2000s action war films
2003 directorial debut films